Protected areas in Madhya Pradesh include 12 National Parks, 24 Wildlife sanctuaries and 3 Biosphere Reserves.

National Parks
Madhya Pradesh is home to twelve of India's National Parks:

Wildlife Sanctuaries
Madhya Pradesh is also home to 25 Wildlife sanctuaries:

Biosphere reserves

See also
 List of protected areas of Gujarat

References

Madhya Pradesh